Anthony Donnelly (April 1886 – April 1947) was an English footballer whose regular position was at full back.

Donnelly started his professional career with Tonge F.C. and Heywood United before transferring to Manchester United in 1908. He helped United win the 1911 league title, but in 1913, he was transferred to Glentoran. Later on, he also played for Chester, Southampton and Middleton Borough, as well as having another spell at Heywood United.

References

1886 births
1947 deaths
People from Middleton, Greater Manchester
English footballers
Association football fullbacks
Heywood United F.C. players
Manchester United F.C. players
Glentoran F.C. players
Chester City F.C. players
Southampton F.C. players